Jesus Meets John the Baptist is a c. 1622 oil on canvas painting by Guido Reni in the Girolamini, Naples, thought (with St. Francis in Ecstasy and The Flight into Egypt) to have been one of three works given to that complex by Domenico Lercaro.

History

References

Bibliography
  Mario Borrelli, Contributo alla storia degli artefici minori e maggiori della mole Girolimiana, Napoli, 1968.
  Carlo Celano, Delle notitie del bello, dell'antico, e del curioso della città di Napoli, 1692.

External links
 Fondazione Zeri entry

Paintings in Naples
Paintings by Guido Reni
Paintings depicting John the Baptist
1622 paintings
Paintings depicting Jesus